Raül Fernandez Miró (Barcelona, 1976), better known as Raül Refree, is a Spanish record producer, musician and composer.

Career 
In 1996, Raül  joined the melodic hardcore group, Barcelona Corn Flakes, with whom he recorded Ménage (1997). He later joined two groups: Romodance, producing Little Symphonies for the Kids (1998) and Zorras (1999), and Sitcom, putting out a self-titled album in 1999. The Élena group, which aimed at a more experimental style of pop, produced Porelamordedios (2001) and Present (2003). He directed and arranged a concert, The Rockdelux Experience, for issue no. 200 of Rockdelux magazine, and a second concert in 2004 for the 20th anniversary of the magazine. Both concerts were later published on CD.

Also in 2002, he began the solo project Refree, with the album Quitamiedos, followed by Nones (2003), La matrona (2005), Els invertebrats (2007), Matilda (2010), Tots Sants (2012), Nova Creu Alta (2013), Jai Alai vol. 01 (2017) and La otra mitad (2018) works in which he alternates Spanish and Catalan. In 2007, he created the show "Immigrasons", about migratory flows between Catalonia and Argentina, with the Argentinian musician Ernesto Snajer, commissioned by Mercat de Música Viva de Vic (MMVV). He also worked with Sílvia Pérez Cruz). He contributed to works commissioned by the MMVV in 2008 with the Mexicans Cabezas de Cera and Juan Pablo Villa in the album Vientos y lugares. In the same year he directed and arranged the show OJO con la Mala, with Mala Rodríguez and the Original Jazz Orchestra del Taller de Músics, and was awarded the Premi Ciutat de Barcelona. In 2009 he composed soundtracks for the series Infidels, from TV3, and toured several times in Europe and the United States with the American singer-songwriter Josh Rouse.
In 2014 he released with Sílvia Pérez Cruz the album Granada, and in 2017 presented, along with Rosalía Vila, Los Ángeles. Both albums as  artist, producer, guitar player and arranger.

In late 2018 he released the soundtracks for the films Entre dos aguas, by Isaki Lacuesta, and Black is Beltza, by Fermín Muguruza.

His last works of his own, in which he has worked as a music player and signing arrangements and production, have been a duo releasing albums with Richard Youngs (All Hands Around The Moment, Soft Abuse, 2019), Lina (Lina_Raül Refree, Glitterbeat, 2020) and Lee Ranaldo (Names of North End Women, Mute, 2020).

His musical productions combines experimental rock, flamenco, author song and pop with occasional jazz influences, according to the project. He interprets his compositions in Catalan and Spanish.

He has produced songs and albums for Guitarricadelafuente,  Ricky Martin, Rosalía, Niño de Elche, Rodrigo Cuevas, Luisa Sobral,  Lee Ranaldo, Sílvia Pérez Cruz, Rocío Márquez, Roger Mas, Nacho Umbert, Senior Brutal Cor, Christina Rosenvinge, Las Migas, Josh Rouse, Kiko Veneno, Mala Rodríguez, Els Pets, among other musicians.

Discography 

Lee Ranaldo & Raül Refree, Names of North End Women (Mute, 2020)
Lina & Raül Refree, Lina_Raül Refree  (Glitterbeat,  2020)
Richard Youngs & Raül Refree, All Hands Around The Moment, (Soft Abuse, 2019)
Lina & Raül Refree, Cuidei que Tinha Morrido (Single) (Glitterbeat, 2019)
Lee Ranaldo & Raül Refree, Names of North End Women (Single) (Mute, 2019)
Refree, La otra mitad (Glitterbeat/tak:til, 2018)
Albert Pla & Raül Refree, Miedo (BSO) (Enunplisplas Música, 2018)
Refree Jai Alai vol.02 (2018)
Refree, Jai Alai vol.01 (El Segell del Primavera, 2017)
Rosalía (Rosalía Vila & Raül Refree),  Los Ángeles (2017, Universal Music Spain)
Sílvia Pérez Cruz & Raül Fernandez Miró (Raül Refree), granada (2014, Universal Music Spain)
Refree, Nova Creu Alta (El segell del Primavera, 2013)
Refree, Tots Sants (2012)
Refree, Matilda (Marxophone, 2010)
Refree, Els invertebrats (Acuarela, 2007)
Refree, La matrona (Acuarela, 2005)
Refree, Nones (Acuarela, 2003)
Refree, Quitamiedos (Acuarela, 2002)

Productions 
Guitarricadelafuente, La Cantera (Sony Entertainment Spain, May 2022)
Perrate, Tres Golpes (fandango callejero) (single)  (Lovemonk Discos Buenos / El Volcán Música, 2022)
Guitarricadelafuente, Vidalita y el mar (Sony Entertainment Spain, 2022)
Guitarricadelafuente, Mil y Una Noches (Sony Entertainment Spain, 2021)
Gabriela Richardson, Palomita Negrita (The Project Music Talent, sl, 2021)
Sílvia Pérez Cruz, Disculpe, Babe [El Justiciero, Cha, Cha, Cha: Un tributo a Os Mutantes] (Warner/Chappell Brasil)
C. Tangana, Un Veneno (G-Mix) [El Madrileño] (Sony Music Entertainment España, 2021)
La M.O.D.A, Ninguna Ola (La M.O.D.A., 2020)
Anaju, Rota (Sony, 2020)
Guitarricadelafuente, Ya Mi Mama Me Decía (Tumbalacasa, 2020)
Ricky Martin, Quiéreme (single from PAUSA) (Sony Music US, 2020)
nostalgia.en.los.autobuses, Ojos brillantes (single) (Altafonte, 2020)
nostalgia.en.los.autobuses, Naturaleza (single) (Altafonte, 2020)
nostalgia.en.los.autobuses, Las tumbas de los escritores (single) (Altafonte, 2020)
nostalgia.en.los.autobuses, Delfines (single) (Altafonte, 2020)
Guitarricadelafuente, Desde las Alturas (Tumbalacasa, 2020)
Cocanha, Puput (Pagans, 2020)
Lina & Raül Refree, Lina_Raül Refree (Glitterbeat, 2020)
Rodrigo Cuevas, Manual de Cortejo, Rodrigo Cuevas Ronda a Raül Refree (Aris Música, 13 December 2019)
La M.O.D.A, Colectivo Nostalgia (2019)
La M.O.D.A., La Zona Galáctica (2019)
Luísa Sobral, Rosa (Universal Music Portugal, 2018)
C. Tangana, El Niño de Elche,  Un Veneno (Sony Music Entertainment Spain, 2018)
 Amaia Romero, Un nuevo lugar (single) (2018, Universal Music Spain), as author and producer
El Niño de Elche, Antología del Cante Flamenco Heterodoxo (Sony Music Entertainment Spain, 2018)
77, Bright Gloom (Century Media, 2018)
     Rocío Márquez, Firmamento (Universal Music Spain, 2017)
     Lee Ranaldo, Electric Trim (Mute, 2017)
     Josele Santiago, Transilvania (2017)
     Maria Rodés, Creo que no soy yo (2016)
     Christina Rosenvinge, Lo nuestro (El segell del Primavera, 2015)
     Nacho Umbert, Familia (2015)
     Lee Ranaldo, Acoustic Dust (2014)
     Rocío Márquez, El Niño (Universal, 2014)
     Silvia Pérez Cruz, Granada (Universal Music Spain, 2014),
     Kiko Veneno, Sensación Térmica (Warner, 2013)
     Els Pets, L'àrea petita (2013)
     Silvia Pérez Cruz,11 de novembre (Universal Music Spain, 2012)
     Nacho Umbert, No os creáis ni la mitad ( Acuarela, 2011)
     Christina Rosenvinge, Un caso sin resolver. (Warner, 2011)
     Fernando Alfaro, La vida es extraña y rara (2011)
     Senior i el Cor Brutal, Gran (Malatesta Records i La Casa Calba, 2011)
     Nacho Umbert, Ay... (Acuarela, 2010)
     Las Migas, Reinas del Matute (Nuevos Medios, 2011)
     El Hijo, Madrileña (2010)
     El Hijo, Las otras vidas (2007)
     Aroah, El día después (2007)
     Roger Mas, Mística doméstica (2006)
     El Hijo, La piel del oso (ep, 2005)
     The Rockdelux Experience vol. II (2004)
     The Rockdelux Experience (2002)

Soundtracks (BSO) 
Un año, una noche, directed by Isaki Lacuesta (Bambú Prod., Nov. 2022)
Ojos Negros, directed by Marta Lallana and Ivet Castelo (Nanouk Films, 2019)
Entre dos aguas, directed by Isaki Lacuesta (La Termita Films, 2018)
Black is Beltza, animated film directed by Fermín Muguruz a (ETB / Setmàgic Audiovisual / Talka Records & Films, 2018)
Yoghurt Utopia, documentary by Anna Thomson & David Baksh (2017)
 Les nenes no haurien de jugar al fútbol, TV movie directed by Sònia Sánchez (Zentropa Int./TVC, 2014)
 Line-up, film directed by Àlex Julià (Igloo Films Prod./Primavera Sound, 2014)
 Et dec una nit de divendres, TV movie directed by Dimas Rodríguez (Imuff Prod./TVC, 2013)
 Barcelona Ciutat Neutral, TV series directed by Sònia Sánchez (Prodigius Cinema/TVC, 2011)
 Barcelona era una fiesta underground, 1970–1980, documentary directed by Morrosko Vila-San-Juan (Séptimo Elemento, 2010)
 Infidels, TV series. From 2009 to 2011 (Diagonal TV/ TVC, 2009–11)

Collaborations 
 A Tocar!, Opening of Festival Grec 2020, with Baró D'Evel, Mal Pelo, Frederic Amat & friends (2020)
 Miedo, interactive musical in 3D, with Albert Pla(2018-)
 Guerra, interactive musical in 3D, with Albert Pla and Fermin Muguruza (2015–2016)
 Ukulele on the song  Last Night on Earth of Lee Ranaldo (2013)
 Rèquiem, with Enric Montefusco (2012)
 Collaborations in recording of Josh Rouse & The Long Vacations, of Josh Rouse (2011)
 Cançons de bandolers i molt mala gent (Songs of bandits and bad people), show with Maria Rodés. Musical direction and arrangements. (2010)
 Brindando con José Alfredo Jiménez with the song "Cuando vivas conmigo". (2010)
 Doubles with Josh Rouse for Europe and USA (2009/2010)
 Ojo con la Mala. Musical director of the concert of Mala Rodríguez with the Original Jazz Orquestra del Taller de Músics. (2008)
 Refree & Standstill interpret E.Varèse, R.Strauss, G.Ligeti, S.Reich y J.Adams. Festival Digressions of Auditorio de Barcelona (2008)
 Vientos y lugares. Co-director of the project; with Juan Pablo Villa y Cabezas de Cera. (Sonoesfera, 2008)
 15 anys del Teatre-Auditori de Sant Cugat (15 years of the Auditorium Theater of Sant Cugat). Direction and arrangements for orchestra. Together with the Orquestra Nacional Clàssica d'Andorra. (2008)
 Immigrasons. Co-director of the project. (Discmedi, 2006)
 String and metal arrangements in El tiempo de las cerezas, of Nacho Vegas and Enrique Bunbury. (2006)

Awards 
 Grammy Latino 2021, Mejor ingeniería de grabación para un álbum: El madrileño
 Grammy Latino 2020, Mejor Álbum Vocal Pop: Ricky Martin - Pausa
 Award "German Critic Quarter Award" for the Best Worldmusic Album (2020)
Nominated in the "Les Victoires du Jazz 2020" in the category "Best World Music Album" with the project "Lina_Raül Refree – Lina_Raül Refree" (2020)
Premi Gaudí: "Best original score" for Entre dos aguas, by Isaki Lacuesta (2018)
 Nominated in the 18th Annual Latin Grammy Awards in the category "Best New Artist" with the project "Rosalía – Los Ángeles" (2017)
 Nominated in the UK Music Video Awards 17 in the category "Best styling in a video in association with i-d" with the video "De Plata" from the album "Rosalía – Los Ángeles" (2017)
Ruido de la Prensa Award for Best Spanish Disc of 2017
Rockdelux #1 Video, #1 Album, #1 Artist of 2017
Time Out Award for Best Album of 2017
ABC, #1 National Record of 2017
     Award Rolling Stone Spain "Best group/soloist of the year" for granada (2014)
     Album of the year for the magazine Rockdelux for granada (2014)
     Award Altaveu "Best Album" for granada (2014)
     Award Enderrock – Joan Trayter "Best Musical Production" (2011)
     Award Ciutat de Barcelona (2008)
     Award Puig Porret for La matrona (2005)
     Award Altaveu "Best pop-rock album" for La matrona (2005)
     Award Enderrock "Best Album" for La matrona (2005)
     Album of the year for the magazine Rockdelux for Nones (2003)

External links 

 
 
 

Spanish record producers
Musicians from Barcelona